The Allie M. Best House, at 344 Athens St. in Hartwell, Georgia, is a Tudor Revival-style house built in 1930.  It was listed on the National Register of Historic Places in 1986.

It is a two-story Tudor Revival house with a Craftsman interior.  It was designed by local architect Luther Temple and was built by Walker and Jule Temple.

It was deemed "architecturally significant as a rare example in Hartwell of an English Tudor-style house", and its grounds were deemed locally significant for their terraced landscaping done by Best.

References

National Register of Historic Places in Hart County, Georgia
Tudor Revival architecture in the United States
Houses completed in 1930
1930 establishments in Georgia (U.S. state)
Houses in Hart County, Georgia